"If Ever You're in My Arms Again" is a 1984 song recorded by American contemporary R&B singer Peabo Bryson. Released as a single from his album Straight from the Heart, the single peaked at number 6 on the R&B chart and was  Bryson's first Top 10 single on the Billboard Hot 100 chart, where it peaked at number 10 during the summer of 1984. It also spent four weeks at number 1 on the adult contemporary chart.

Personnel
 Peabo Bryson – lead vocals
 Randy Kerber – acoustic piano, Yamaha DX7
 Paul Jackson, Jr. – guitars
 Neil Stubenhaus – bass guitar
 Carlos Vega – drums
 Lee Holdridge – string arrangements and conductor
 Michael Masser – rhythm track arrangements
 Gene Page – rhythm track arrangements
 Richard Marx – backing vocals
 Deborah Thomas – backing vocals

Charts

Weekly charts

Year-end charts

In popular culture
The song was used as a love theme for the Kelly Capwell and Joe Perkins characters on the daytime serial Santa Barbara.

See also
List of number-one adult contemporary singles of 1984 (U.S.)

References

External links
Single release info at discogs.com

1984 songs
1984 singles
Peabo Bryson songs
Songs with lyrics by Cynthia Weil
Songs written by Tom Snow
Elektra Records singles
Songs written by Michael Masser
Pop ballads
Contemporary R&B ballads
Love themes
1980s ballads